How Ivanushka the Fool Travelled in Search of Wonder (trans. Kak Ivanushka-durachok za chudom khodil) is a 1977 Soviet fantasy film produced by Kinostudiya Lenfilm, and directed by Nadezhda Kosheverova.

Plot 
Ivanushka the fool meets a robber in the forest. After having a fight with him, Ivanushka brings the bag with stolen goods back to its original owner, a merchant named Marco the Rich. There he meets his daughter Nastya. They fell in love, but Marco the Rich does not want Ivanushka to marry his daughter, and decides to send a woman named Varvara to poison him.

Nastya gives Ivanushka a letter, in which she warns him of the danger. Varvara fails to poison the protagonist, and tells Ivanushka the truth. She suggests him to leave in secret, but returns and tells Marco the Rich that Ivanushka allegedly died. Hearing this, Nastya faints into a coma. Doctors say that only a miracle can save her. Ivanushka decides to go to Baba-Yaga to seek advice, and she tells him to go to a wizard named Lukomor. Ivanushka embarks on a journey from thereon.

Cast 

 Oleg Dahl as Ivanushka the Fool
 Elena Proklova as Nastenka
 Mikhail Gluzskiy as Marko  Bogatyi
 Tatyana Pelttser as Baba  Varvara
 Vladimir Etush as Fakir
 Andrei Popov as Lukomor Lukomorich
 Aleksandr Benyaminov as Luka
 Mariya Barabanova as Baba Yaga
 Igor Dmitriev as the king
 Mikhail Boyarskiy as Fyodor Ivanovich
 Sergey Filippov as Zamorskiy lekar
 Boris Arakelov as the thief
 Aleksandr Afanasev as Sluga
 Gennadi Dyudyayev as Vasiliy

References

External links 

 

1977 films
Films based on fairy tales
Soviet fantasy films
Films directed by Nadezhda Kosheverova
1970s fantasy films
1970s Russian-language films